Norma San Leonardo Club de Fútbol is a football team based in San Leonardo de Yagüe in the autonomous community of Castile and León. Founded in 1991, it plays in the Primera Provincial de Soria. Its stadium is Estadio El Pontón with a capacity of 2,000 seats.

Season to season

11 seasons in Tercera División

Notable former players
 Ubay Luzardo
 Pacheta

External links
Official website
elportaldelfutbol.es.tl profile
Futbolme.com profile

Football clubs in Castile and León
Association football clubs established in 1991
Divisiones Regionales de Fútbol clubs
1991 establishments in Spain
Province of Soria